Reinhard Schaletzki (21 May 1916 – 21 March 1995), born in Upper Silesia, was a German international footballer.

References

1916 births
1995 deaths
Association football midfielders
German footballers
Germany international footballers